

1st United States Lancers Regiment

The regiment was organized by Colonel Arthur Rankin of Windsor, Ontario at Detroit, Saginaw, and St. Johns, Michigan between November 30. 1861, to February 20, 1862 and was mustered out on March 20, 1862 without seeing active service.

686 men were recruited before creation of the regiment was abandoned.

Chandler's Horse Guard

The unit was organized by Major William C. Hughs at Coldwater, Michigan on September 19, 1861 and was mustered out after three months of service on November 22, 1861 as the battalion  did not conform to Federal mustering regulations.  The unit was remusted and reequipped, but refused to obey an order to remuster in and the unit was discontinued.  189 men served in the Horse Guard.

See also
List of Michigan Civil War Units
Michigan in the American Civil War

Notes

References
The Civil War Archive

.
Civil War, Minor
Michigan in the American Civil War